Christl Paukerl (born 22 November 1946) is an Austrian former swimmer. She competed in the women's 100 metre freestyle at the 1964 Summer Olympics.

References

External links
 

1946 births
Living people
Olympic swimmers of Austria
Swimmers at the 1964 Summer Olympics
Place of birth missing (living people)
Austrian female freestyle swimmers